Steven Crikey! Lee (born 6 August 1962 in Falls Creek) is an Australian alpine skier. He competed in the 1984, 1988 and 1992 Winter Olympics, and had a competitive career lasting just on 25 years. He is the second of only 3 Australian skiers ever to claim victory on the Alpine World Cup circuit. He has also done sports commentating for channels 7, 9 and 10, co-owns Chill Factor magazine, and is a national selector and president of Falls Creek Race Club. He has worked in movies with Roger Moore and Jackie Chan.

Media biography

Lee has been the television host and commentator, especially in winter sports.

His most recent major event was the 2014 Sochi Winter Olympic Games for Australian TV Channel 10. Previously he called the 2006 Winter Olympics. Paired with Bruce McAvaney for alpine, and Matt White for freestyle, they called all the skiing events, including Dale Begg-Smith's gold medal performance in mogul skiing.

His other TV work includes the 98 Nagano Olympics, 2000 Sydney Olympics, the 2002 Salt Lake Olympics and the 1999, 2001, 2003, 2005 alpine and freestyle world championships.

He was host and commentator of 200 plus White Circus TV shows airing on the Seven Network from 1999 to 2002, covering all FIS (Federation of international ski) events, alpine, freestyle, snowboard and ski jumping.

He commentated the 2000 Australian Mountain Bike Champs.

He has also been a consultant on other winter sport coverage.

Magazines and online media

Lee is co editor/owner of Chill Factor ski magazine www.chillfactor.com. Previous to Chill Factor, he was a contributing writer for all ski magazine publications over the last 20 years. He is co owner and editor of www.surfingworld.com.au.

Film

Lee did stunt work for Jackie Chan film First Strike, produced at Falls Creek, as a lead stunt skier and snowmobiler.

He did stunt ski work for Willy Bogner's James Bond spoof Fire Ice & Dynamite.

RAP Films feature skier for movies Skiers Dream, Into the Snow Zone & Return to the Snow Zone.

Ski competition biography
World Cup, 1981–92
Victory in World Cup Super-G, Furano, Japan. View Official Results
20 top 15 finishes in World Cup downhill and Super G.
Best World Ranking: 13th.

3 X Olympian: 84, 88, 92
Best Finish 11th: in combined Downhill 92.

6 X World Champs
1982–1991. Best finishes: 8th place in Super G Vail 89, 10th in Downhill Bormio 85, 9th in combination Downhill Bormio 85.

US Pro Tour 1993 -95
1/4 Finalist in Jackson Hole GS, Round of 16 in Schladming GS, Heavenly Valley GS, Stratton Mt SL.
Retired winning the most improved ranking title, lifting ranking to 26th overall in the world and 17th in GS.
Head of Racer Committee responsible for the introduction of Downhill races to the 1994/95 tour, and was president elect of the 1995/96 racer board.

King of the Mountain Downhill series 1996-7
 Invited to compete in Pro Downhill tour made up of World cup winners, Olympic and World Championship
medal winners. With results of 3rd, 2nd, 2nd and 1st in the finals Team Commonwealth (made up of Lee and Martin Bell of Great Britain) won the International team cup.

King of the Mountain Downhill series, 1997-8
 Team commonwealth was 4th in the overall standings.

Endurance racing 

50K of Coronet. 7/2000 & 7/2001
16-hour non-stop race in New Zealand.
Team members, included AJ Bear, Craig Branch.
Finished 3rd.
24hrs of Aspen, World champs of Endurance racing. 12/2000.
24hr non-stop race in Aspen Colorado.
Team Australia also included Shaun Turner.
Finished 3rd.
24hrs of Aspen, World champs of Endurance racing. 12/2001.
24hr non-stop race in Aspen Colorado.
Team Australia included Al Guss.
Finished 4th.
Retired from competitive ski racing 2001.

World Cup, World Champ and Olympic results 
16 February 1992 –  Val d'Isere 		FRA  	Olympic Winter Games Super G 30
11 February 1992 –  Val d'Isere 		FRA  	Olympic Winter Games Combined 19
11 February 1992 –  Val d'Isere 		FRA  	FIS Race  Slalom  22
10 February 1992 –  Val d'Isere 		FRA  	FIS Race  Downhill  14
8 February 1989 –  Vail 		USA  	FIS World Championships Super G  8
11 March 1988 –  Beaver Creek 	USA  	FIS World Cup  Downhill  14
15 February 1988 –  CalgaryDownhill	CAN 	Olympic Winter Games Downhill 19
25 January 1988 –  Leukerbad 		SUI  	FIS World Cup  Super G  9
24 January 1988 –  Leukerbad 		SUI  	FIS World Cup  Downhill  15
17 January 1988 –  Bad Kleinkircheim 	AUT  	FIS World Cup  Combined  13
1 February 1987 –  Crans Montana 	SUI  	FIS World Championships Combined 15
1 February 1987 –  Crans Montana 	SUI  	FIS Race  Downhill  11
7 February 1986 –  St. Anton 		AUT  	FIS World Cup  Combined  14
19 January 1986 –  Kitzbuhel 		AUT  	FIS World Cup  Combined  10
3 March 1985 –  Furano 		JPN  	FIS World Cup  Super G  1
2 March 1985 –  Furano 		JPN  	FIS World Cup  Downhill  7
3 February 1985 –  Bormio 		ITA  	FIS World Championships Downhill 10
1 February 1985 –  Bormio 		ITA  	FIS Race  Downhill  9
19 January 1985 –  Wengen 		SUI  	FIS World Cup  Downhill  12
12 January 1985 –  Kitzbuhel 		AUT  	FIS World Cup  Downhill  13
4 March 1984 –  Aspen 		USA  	FIS World Cup  Downhill  12
16 February 1984 –  Sarajevo		JUG 	Olympic Winter Games Downhill 19
2 February 1984 –  Cortina d'Ampezzo ITA  	FIS World Cup  Downhill  9
21 January 1984 –  Kitzbuhel 		AUT  	FIS World Cup  Downhill  13
15 January 1984 –  Wengen 		SUI  	FIS World Cup  Downhill  6
9 December 1983 –  Val d'Isere 		FRA  	FIS World Cup  Downhill  11
11 February 1983 –  Markstein 		FRA  	FIS World Cup  Combined  8
6 February 1983 –  St. Anton 		AUT  	FIS World Cup  Combined  6
21 January 1983 –  Kitzbuhel 		AUT  	FIS World Cup  Downhill  10
5 February 1982 –  Schladming 	AUT  	FIS Race  Downhill  15

Health 
On the 6th of September 2020, Steve Lee suffered a major stroke at his home in Falls Creek.

He was moved to a rehab facility in Wangaratta and will need ongoing 24/7 care.

References

External links

1962 births
Living people
Australian male alpine skiers
Olympic alpine skiers of Australia
Alpine skiers at the 1984 Winter Olympics
Alpine skiers at the 1988 Winter Olympics
Alpine skiers at the 1992 Winter Olympics